Luigia Poloni (26 January 1802 – 11 November 1855) was an Italian Roman Catholic nun and was also the co-founder of the Sisters of Mercy of Verona which she established with Charles Steeb. She took the name of "Maria Vincenza" when she became a nun.

Cardinal Angelo Amato - on behalf of Pope Benedict XVI - beatified Poloni in 2008 after the recognition of a miracle attributed to her intercession.

Life
Luigia Poloni was born in 1802 in Verona as the last of twelve children to Gaetano Poloni and Margherita Biadego. She was baptized hours after her birth as "Maria Luigia Francesca". She grew up in a Christian environment and was engaged in charitable acts - following in the footsteps of her father who was part of a volunteer group.

Poloni came into contact with the priest Charles Steeb and found in him a friend and confidante. She confided all in him and it was through this connection that her vocation grew. The two established a religious congregation as the two envisioned and Poloni made her religious profession on 10 September 1848. She assumed the name of "Maria Vincenza" at her profession. The two aimed for the new congregation to spread the merciful love of Jesus Christ which was believed to be of paramount importance for it would lift man to full communion with God. Poloni believed that all charitable acts was something that would need to be placed as one of the top priorities in life.

She - with admirable zeal - made it her mission to visit all those who were sick and orphaned. She made it her business to console them and to help them with their lives while showing them the love of Christ. She also worked with the poor and said of them: "the poor are our masters".

She was hit with a tumor that consumed her at a slow pace. She underwent an operation in order to ease the pain but it failed to improve her condition. Poloni died on 11 November 1855.

Legacy
The congregation that Poloni and Steeb established grew outside of Verona and expanded to nations such as Portugal and Tanzania amongst others in each continent.

Beatification
The beatification process commenced on 12 March 1990 in Verona and the commencement of the cause conferred upon her the title of Servant of God. The process saw the accumulation of documentation that spanned from 1990 until 1993. The process - before the cause could proceed - was ratified on 3 December 1993. The Positio - a file of all documentation - was submitted to the Congregation for the Causes of Saints in Rome in 1999.

Pope Benedict XVI approved her life of heroic virtue and proclaimed her to be Venerable on 28 April 2006.

The miracle that was needed for her beatification was investigated in 1994 and was ratified on 7 April 1995. Benedict XVI approved the healing as a miracle on 17 December 2007 and allowed for her beatification on 21 September 2008. Cardinal Angelo Amato presided over the beatification on behalf of the pope.

References

External links
Hagiography Circle
Sisters Servants of Mercy of Verona

1802 births
1855 deaths
Founders of Catholic religious communities
19th-century venerated Christians
Beatifications by Pope Benedict XVI
Italian beatified people
Venerated Catholics by Pope Benedict XVI